Marita Lange (born 22 June 1943 in Halle) is a former athlete from East Germany, who won the silver medal behind team mate Margitta Gummel in the shot put event at the 1968 Summer Olympics held in Mexico City, Mexico.

References

External links
 Sports Reference

1943 births
Living people
East German female shot putters
Olympic silver medalists for East Germany
Sportspeople from Halle (Saale)
Athletes (track and field) at the 1968 Summer Olympics
Athletes (track and field) at the 1972 Summer Olympics
Olympic athletes of East Germany
European Athletics Championships medalists
Medalists at the 1968 Summer Olympics
Olympic silver medalists in athletics (track and field)